Kim Jung-nan (born Kim Hyun-ah on July 16, 1971) is a South Korean actress. Kim made her acting debut in 1991, but received a new surge of popularity after starring in A Gentleman's Dignity in 2012.

Filmography

Film

Television series

Radio shows

Television show

Awards and nominations

References

External links

  
 
 
 

1971 births
Living people
South Korean film actresses
South Korean television actresses
South Korean radio presenters
Dongguk University alumni
South Korean women radio presenters